Tao Xiaoqiang (born 29 November 1973) is a Chinese badminton player. He competed in two events at the 1996 Summer Olympics.

References

1973 births
Living people
Chinese male badminton players
Olympic badminton players of China
Badminton players at the 1996 Summer Olympics
Place of birth missing (living people)
20th-century Chinese people